Filippo Visconti, O.S.A. or Philippus Vicecomes (9 August 1596 – 26 January 1664) was a Roman Catholic prelate who served as Bishop of Catanzaro (1657–1664).

Biography
Filippo Visconti was born in Milan, Italy on 9 August 1596 and ordained a priest in the Order of Saint Augustine.
On 23 April 1657, he was appointed by Pope Alexander VII as Bishop of Catanzaro. On 6 May 1657, he was consecrated bishop by Bernardino Spada, Cardinal-Bishop of Palestrina.

He served as Bishop of Catanzaro until his death on 26 January 1664.

His bust and memorial inscription are preserved in the church of S. Agostino in Rome, the headquarters of the Augustinian Order.

References

External links and additional sources
Accetta, Foca (1999). "Le 'confessioni' e 'confusioni' di un agostiniano milanese presule in Calabria. La corrispondenza di Filippo Visconti, vescovo di Catanzaro (1657–1664)," in: Analecta Augustiniana 62 (Roma 1999), pp. 5–124. 

17th-century Italian Roman Catholic bishops
Bishops appointed by Pope Alexander VII
1596 births
1664 deaths
Augustinian bishops